The 1974–75 Football League Cup was the 15th season of the Football League Cup, a knockout competition for England's top 92 football clubs. The tournament started on 19 August 1974 and ended with the final at Wembley on 1 March 1975.

Aston Villa won the tournament after defeating Norwich City in the final at Wembley Stadium, London.

First round

Ties

Replays

Second replays

Third replay

Second round

Ties

Replays

Second replays

Third replay

Third round

Ties

Replays

Second replay

Fourth round

Ties

Replays

Fifth Round

Ties

Replays

Semi-finals

First leg

Second leg

Final

The final was held at Wembley Stadium, London, on 1 March 1975.

References

General

Specific

EFL Cup seasons
Cup
1974–75 domestic association football cups
Lea